The Georgian National Badminton Championships is a tournament organized to crown the best badminton players in Georgia. They are held since the season 1990/1991.

Past winners

References
Badminton Europe - Details of affiliated national organisations
Georgian National Badminton Federation Yearbook

National badminton championships
Badminton in Georgia (country)
Recurring sporting events established in 1991
Sports competitions in Georgia (country)
1991 establishments in Georgia (country)